Luigi Petri (8 September 1860- 28 March 1911) was an Italian painter and manuscript illuminator, active in Florence.

Biography
He was born in Florence. He studied design with the architect Leopoldo Massari. He is noted for his commissions for the Princess Corsini, Senator Gadda, Senator Vigliani, the commune of Livorno. He completed many commissions for the House of Savoy. He died in Florence the 28 march 1911 and was buried by the Ven. Arciconfraternita della Misericordia di Firenze.

References

1860 births
Year of death unknown
19th-century Italian painters
Italian male painters
Manuscript illuminators
Painters from Florence
19th-century Italian male artists